Amtrak's Heritage Fleet consisted of the rolling stock provided to it when it assumed passenger service on commercial railroads.  The name was applied to a program begun in 1977 to convert the older, mainly streamlined, cars from steam heating to head-end power. Head end power conversions were performed at Amtrak's Beech Grove Shops, outside of Indianapolis. The program was completed by the mid-1980s, and the fleet was fully retired by 2019. The last car was a former Great Northern Railway full-length dome car, which was manufactured in 1955 and retired in 2019 by Amtrak, due to the age and expense of maintaining the Great Dome Car.

History
The rebuild cost $300,000 per car. The Atchison, Topeka and Santa Fe Railway handled the conversion of the Hi-Levels in its Topeka, Kansas shops.

Heritage baggage and dining cars were used on the single-level trains serving the Eastern U.S. out of New York City through late 2017. The baggage cars from Amtrak's Viewliner II order, placed in 2010, fully replaced the Heritage versions: the last was delivered in December 2015. Twelve diners are also now in revenue service. In January 2018, due to high maintenance costs for the 60+ year old cars, Amtrak announced the retirement of the last five remaining "Pacific Parlour" Hi-Level lounge cars still in active service on the Coast Starlight, bringing an end to the era of Heritage Fleet equipment in regular revenue service. The last run using one of these cars was on February 4, 2018. The last remaining Great Dome car, Ocean View, was retired in 2019 by Amtrak, due to its age and maintenance expenses.

Roster

See also
 Union Pacific Heritage Fleet

References

External links

Amtrak rolling stock
Rail passenger cars of the United States